Hollrungia is a monotypic genus in the family Passifloraceae.

References

Passifloraceae
Malpighiales genera
Monotypic rosid genera
Flora of Papua New Guinea
Flora of Queensland